Chittaranjan National Cancer Institute  is a cancer care hospital and research institute and one of the 27 regional cancer centres in India. It is located in Kolkata near Jatin Das Park metro station at Hazra More. It was formally inaugurated by Prof. Madam J.Curie on 2 January 1950, as Chittaranjan Cancer Hospital, named after Chittaranjan Das, who donated land and property for the cause. This campus( first campus) also serves as a cutting-edge cancer research centre.

Second campus
On 19 August 2020 the institute started its OPD services from its state of the art 460 bedded campus at Rajarhat.
The campus at Newtown was built under the Union Ministry of Health. The building is equipped with all the latest facilities for cancer treatment including nuclear medicine, endoscopy suite, modern brachytherapy units, 650 beds (or 460 beds), accommodations for relatives of patients, and for doctors. Rs 1,000 crore was spent for this project and it was inaugurated by Prime Minister Narendra Modi on 7 January 2022.
More than ₹530 crore has been spent, out of which around ₹400 crore have been provided by the Union government and the rest by the Government of West Bengal.

References

External links 
 Official Website

Hospital buildings completed in 1950
Regional Cancer Centres in India
Cancer hospitals
Hospitals in Kolkata
Research institutes in Kolkata
Research institutes in West Bengal
1950 establishments in West Bengal
Medical research institutes in India
1950 establishments in India
Oncology
20th-century architecture in India